Nobel Chor   is a 2012 Bengali-language Indian film directed by Suman Ghosh, starring Mithun Chakraborty, Soumitra Chatterjee, Roopa Ganguly and Saswata Chatterjee. The film was officially selected for the BFI London Film Festival.

Plot
The first Asian Nobel Laureate, Rabindranath Tagore, is still revered as an icon in India. On 24 March 2004, his Nobel medal was stolen from Shantiniketan in Bengal, where it was housed in his residence turned museum. Subsequently, a nationwide furor started and a massive search operation was put in place to find the guilty. Ultimately the medal was not found and the Central Bureau of Investigations (CBI) dropped the case in 2010. With this in the backdrop "Nobel Chor" (The Nobel Thief) is a fictional account of a poor farmer, Bhanu, who circumstantially gets involved in the theft. He decides to embark on a journey to the City of Joy – Kolkata – to return or sell the prize with a view to improve his own quality of life as well as that of his impoverished village.

He becomes the hope of the entire village. On arrival in the city, Bhanu encounters myriad experiences with crooks, strange memorabilia collectors, entrepreneurs who want to exploit the poor man who just has a simple of dream of being able to give his son a better future and uplift the state of his impoverished village. Nobel Chor is the story of this journey through which the film explores contemporary India at its fullest – the encroachment of globalization, the rural-urban divide and the state of India's villages. More importantly it is a trenchant exploration of the relevance of Tagore's philosophy in modern India.

Cast
 Mithun Chakraborty as Bhanu
 Soumitra Chatterjee as Master Moshai
 Roopa Ganguly as Diya
 Saswata Chatterjee as Hori
 Soma Banerjee as Bhanu's wife
 Sankar Debnath as Manmatho Pagla
 Sudipta Chakraborty as Monu
 Arindam Sil as SP Birbhum
 Harsh Chhaya as Raj
 Swapnil Ghosh as Ratul
 Sujoy Ghosh as a civilian, who doesn't know who Rabindranath Tagore is (cameo)

References

External links
 

Films set in Kolkata
Works about Rabindranath Tagore
Bengali-language Indian films
2010s Bengali-language films
Films scored by Bickram Ghosh
Films directed by Suman Ghosh